Jinny Jogindera Sims (born June 7, 1952) is an Indian-born Canadian politician, who was elected as a New Democratic Party Member of the Legislative Assembly of British Columbia in the 2017 provincial election in Surrey-Panorama. She previously was elected to the House of Commons of Canada in the 2011 election. She represented the electoral district of Newton—North Delta as a member of the New Democratic Party.

Early life
Sims emigrated to England from Punjab, India, at the age of nine. She earned a Bachelor of Education degree at the Victoria University of Manchester (now the University of Manchester). Sims and her husband moved to Canada in 1975, spending two years in Quebec before moving to Nanaimo where she was a high school teacher until the early 2000s.

BCTF president
She was elected president of the BC Teachers' Federation in 2004 and served in that role until 2007. In her role as president of the BCTF, she was involved in the May 2005 provincial  election when the BC Liberal Party, a week before the election, accused the BCTF of having a "secret plan" to strike two days after the election; the organization subsequently filed a defamation lawsuit. When the teachers, who had been working for over a year without a contract, did provide strike notice in September 2005, the provincial government immediately extended, by legislation, the last contract to June 2006 and made a potential strike illegal. Regardless, Sims led the teachers in job action, culminating in a two-week strike. The Labour Relations Board determined the strike illegal and the BC Supreme Court found the BCTF in civil contempt of court, fined the BCTF $500,000 and ordered the BCTF not pay the teachers a strike pay. The strike ended when the membership voted to accept a $150-million mediated settlement which both the government and the BCTF executive had endorsed. Sims's BCTF successfully negotiated a five-year contract in June 2006.

Accusations
Jinny sims was cleared of any wrongdoing. In October, 2019 allegations of misconduct were made against Sims, resulting in her resignation as Minister of Citizens Services. A special prosecutor, Richard Peck, was appointed to investigate the charges. Sims was accused of writing support letters for travel visas and of telling her staff to bypass freedom of information laws by using personal email and WhatsApp rather than official email addresses. In April, 2020 the special prosecutor reported that he and the RCMP had found no evidence to support the charges against her and had cleared her of any wrongdoing.

Electoral record

Provincial elections

Federal elections

References

External links

Official NDP Site
How'd They Vote Summary

1952 births
Living people
Members of the Executive Council of British Columbia
Members of the House of Commons of Canada from British Columbia
New Democratic Party MPs
Indian emigrants to Canada
British Columbia New Democratic Party MLAs
Canadian politicians of Punjabi descent
Women government ministers of Canada
Women members of the House of Commons of Canada
People from Surrey, British Columbia
Women MLAs in British Columbia
21st-century Canadian politicians
21st-century Canadian women politicians